XHREV-FM is a radio station on 104.3 FM in Los Mochis, Sinaloa. It is owned by Grupo Chávez Radio and operated by Roque Mascareño Chávez as one of four stations in Sinaloa known as Vibra Radio.

History
XEZA-AM 740 in Topolobampo received its concession on September 6, 1973. The 250-watt station was owned by Ernesto Tirado Zavala.

In the early 1990s, XEZA moved to 770 kHz and increased its power to 5,000 watts as a daytimer in order to move to Los Mochis. It was acquired by Radio Z, S.A. in 1990 and changed its callsign to XEFTA-AM. XEFTA became XEREV later in the 1990s and migrated to FM in 2011.

In 2021, Grupo Chávez Radio leased XHREV and XHGML-FM in Guamúchil to Roque Mascareño Chávez—grandson of the founder of Chávez Radio—for his Vibra Radio venture, which had also purchased XHVQ-FM in Culiacán and XHMAT-FM in Mazatlán.

References

Radio stations in Sinaloa